Ganchev is a Bulgarian surname. Notable people with the surname include:

 Aleksandar Ganchev (born 2001), Bulgarian footballer
 Dimitar Ganchev (1875–1912), Bulgarian revolutionary 
 Grisha Ganchev (born 1962), Bulgarian businessman and oligarch
 Ivko Ganchev (born 1965), Bulgarian football goalkeeper

Bulgarian-language surnames